Teesta River is a  long river that rises in the Pauhunri Mountain of eastern Himalayas, flows through the Indian states of Sikkim and West Bengal and subsequently enters Bangladesh through Rangpur division. In Bangladesh, it falls into Brahmaputra River which after meeting some other major rivers of Bengal delta finally falls into the Bay of Bengal. In India, it flows through Mangan District, Gangtok District, Pakyong District, Kalimpong district, Darjeeling District, Jalpaiguri District, Cooch Behar districts and the cities of Rangpo, Jalpaiguri and Mekhliganj. In Bangladesh, it flows through Lalmonirhat District, Rangpur District, Kurigram District and Gaibandha District. Teesta is the largest river of Sikkim and second largest river of West Bengal after the Ganges.

Course 

The Teesta River originates from Teesta Khangtse Glacier, west of Pahunri (or Teesta Kangse) glacier above , and flows southward through gorges and rapids in the Sikkim Himalaya.

It is fed by streams from Tso Lhamo Lake, Gurudongmar Lake and rivulets arising in the Thangu Valley, Yumthang Valley of Flowers, Dikchu and Donkha mountain ranges. The river then flows past the towns of Chungthang, Singhik, Mangan, Dikchu, Makha where some major tributaries like Kanaka river joins and reaches Singtam, where it is spanned by scenic Indreni Bridge. Also in Singtam, a large tributary of Teesta called Ranikhola joins and then descends towards Bardang, Majitar, Mining where ot is spanned by Rangpo - Mining Teesta Bridge and reaches the city of Rangpo where Rangpo River, the second largest tributary of Teesta joins. From here river Teesta forms the border between Sikkim and West Bengal up to Teesta Bazaar via Melli. Just before the Teesta Bridge, where the roads from Kalimpong and Darjeeling join, the river is met by its largest tributary, the Rangeet River.

After this point, Teesta river changes its course southwards flowing into West Bengal and some more tributaries like Relli River, Riyang river, Geil Khola etc joins. After crossing Sevoke, the river is fed by some small tributaries like Chel Khola, Neora Khola, Leesh Khola etc, and than reaches Gajoldoba where there is Teesta Barrage. The river then flows through Jalpaiguri, where there is Jalpaiguri Teesta Bridge which links Northeastern States. The river flows  further down through Mekhliganj and Haldibari in Cooch Behar district, where it is spanned by Joyee Setu, the longest roadway bridge of West Bengal with length 3.8 kilometres.

Here the river completes its journey in India and enters Bangladesh in Dahagram, Rangpur Division. The river descends towards Barakhata, where there is Teesta Barrage of Bangladesh. Further it reaches Rangpur  and Lalmonirhat town in Lalmonirhat District  and Nilphamari District. After crossing Tepamadhupur Bazaar, Nagrakura Bazaar,  Sundarganj and Bozra Bazaar, river Teesta joins Brahmaputra River at Haripur Port near  Gaibandha, Phulchhari Upazila in Kurigram District of Bangladesh.

Geography 

Through its course, the Teesta river has carved out ravines and gorges in Sikkim meandering through the hills with the hill station of Kalimpong lying just off the river and the city of Siliguri at the foothills of Himalaya. Variegated vegetation can be seen along this route. At lower elevations, tropical deciduous trees and shrubs cover the surrounding hills; alpine vegetation is seen at the upper altitudes. The river is flanked by white sand which is used by the construction industry in the region. Large boulders in and around the waters make it ideal for rafting enthusiasts.

Between Rangpo town and the railway bridge (popularly called Lohapul or iron bridge) on it as it enters the plains at Sevoke, the Teesta flows with a very strong current, ideal for white river rafting. Towns like Teesta Bazaar and Melli have facilities for group rafting. Though the river looks innocuous, the underlying current is very strong. In 1915, G.P. Robertson, the then Municipal Engineer of Darjeeling, drowned after losing control of the boat in the turbulence while surveying the river. The boat struck a partially hidden boulder and was sucked in by a whirlpool, leaving no trace of the occupants.

During the monsoon, Teesta river distends its banks; both in size and turbulence. Landslides in this region often dam up parts of the river in this season. It has also caused severe flooding, multiple times during monsoon in Bangladesh.

Changes in course of rivers 

In the past, the Teesta flowed south from Jalpaiguri in three channels: the Punarbhaba, Atrai and Karatoya Rivers. The Teesta changed course as a result of the flooding of 1787, turning southeast to become part of the Brahmaputra.

Hydroelectric projects and barrages 

India has an estimated total hydroelectric power potential of 84 GW at 60% load factor. Of this, Sikkim's potential share is 2.9%, or about 4.29 GW.

The successfully completed major projects and dams of Teesta River System are as follows:
Teesta -V Dam : Output - 510MW,  Dam Location - Dikchu, Gangtok district, Sikkim. Powerhouse Location - Balutar, Singtam, Gangtok district, Sikkim. Constructed by - NHPC Limited
Teesta III Dam : Output - 1200 MW Dam Location - Chungthang, Mangan district, Sikkim. Powerhouse Location - Singhik, Mangan district, Sikkim. Constructed by - Teesta Urja Limited. .
Teesta Low Dam III : Output - 132MW , Dam & Powerhouse location - Rambi Bazar, Kalimpong district, West Bengal Constructed by - NHPC Limited.
Teesta Low Dam IV: Output- 160MW, Dam & Powerhouse Location - Kalijhora, Kalimpong district, West Bengal Constructed by - NHPC Limited.
Teesta Barrage - Location - Gajoldoba, Jalpaiguri district, West Bengal
Barakhata Teesta Barrage- Location: Goddimari, Barakhata, Nilphamari District, Bangladesh.
Teesta VI Dam: Output: 500MW, Dam Location: Sirwani, Singtam, Gangtok district, Sikkim. Powerhouse Location: Pamphok, Namchi district, Sikkim. Constructed by - NHPC Limited& Lanco Infratech Limited.
Rangit III Dam:  On Greater Rangeet River which is a tributary of Teesta River. Output:60MW, Location:Legship, Gyalshing district, Sikkim.Constructed by - NHPC Limited  
Gati Hydropower Project: A 110 MW Gati Hydropower Project lies on River Rangpo, a tributary of River Teesta. Location - Between the town of Rorathang and Rongli of Pakyong District in  Sikkim Constructed by - Gati Hydropower Limited.
Dikchu River Hydroelectric Power Project: Output: 96 MW on Dikchu River, tributary of River Teesta, Location - Dikchu, Gangtok district, Sikkim. Constructed by- Sneha Kinetic Power Projects Pvt. Ltd.
 Madhya Bharat Power Corporation Limited : on Ranikhola, a tributary of Teesta, Output: 96MW Dam location- Ranipool, Gangtok district, Sikkim. Powerhouse Location- Kumrek, Pakyong district, Sikkim.

The other three completed projects are significantly smaller and minor—Lower Lagyap, Upper Rongni Chhu and Mayang Chhu projects.

Water sharing challenge
Disputes over the appropriate allocation and development of the water resources of the river have remained a subject of conflict between India and Bangladesh for almost 35 years, with several bilateral agreements and rounds of talks failing to produce results.

Negotiations have been going on since 1983. In 1983, a temporary solution had been worked out— Bangladesh would get 36%, India would get 39% while the rest of the water remained unallocated. Both countries signed a water sharing treaty in 1996 which would look into water sharing between the two countries in general following the Ganges water dispute. The water sharing remains a challenge.

Seismic concerns
Teesta river area is in the seismically active Zone-V and has experienced micro-seismic activity. According to India's Ministry of Environment & Forests, the Teesta river dam projects have been approved with the requirement that they adopt suitable seismic coefficient in the design for the dam, tunnel, surge shaft and power house. The projects are cascaded over the length of the river, do not store large amounts water, have small reservoirs, and therefore the projects are expected to have very low risk from the reservoir induced seismicity in the area.

Climate and tectonics 
The Teesta river has preserved good imprints of climatic and tectonics along its valleys and catchments. The interrelationship between climate, erosion, deposition and tectonic activities is not properly understood to date. These are being studied.

See also 
Jaldhaka River

References

External links 

 
 

International rivers of Asia
Rivers of Bangladesh
Rivers of India
Tributaries of the Brahmaputra River
Bay of Bengal
Rivers of Sikkim
Rivers of West Bengal
Rivers of Rangpur Division